Brian Adam Douglas (born 1972) is a Brooklyn-based multidisciplinary artist whose practices include monumental woodcuts, stencils, large scale drawings and collage. Douglas executes street art under the name "Elbow-Toe" and has since exhibited in galleries.

Early life and education 
Douglas was born in Garland, Texas and was raised in Plano, Texas. At eighteen he moved to New York City to attend the School of Visual Arts where he graduated in 1994.

Career

Street art
Douglas’ work first came to the public's attention through his street art—wheat-pasted collages and chalk drawings made under the name Elbow-Toe. As his street art evolved from simple character designs to more complex collages and linocuts, Douglas began to draw the attention of the gallery world, progressing to group shows in London, Los Angeles and New York .

Cut Paper Paintings
Beginning in 2007, Douglas began exhibiting works made entirely out of paper. He refers to his process as paper paintings rather than as collage. "I see each piece of paper as a brushstroke rather than as a juxtaposed idea." The cut paper paintings developed out of a desire to produce work for the street that would be easier to produce, but over time the process became much more labor-intensive,<ref>Juxtapoz interview with Brian Adam Douglas', Juxtapoz # 125, 2011, p. 116</ref> with most pieces taking between three and six months to produce.

Interactive Art
Beginning in 2015, Douglas began programming interactive artworks in Javascript and HTML5, and he began releasing them in 2016 on the ENDGAMES Interactive website. The premier release was titled Obsessive Compulsive Disorder.

Exhibitions

 2007: O’ Wise King How Long Will You Last, Leonard Street Gallery, London, UK
 2011: Due Date, Black Rat Projects, London, UK; Warrington Museum, Warrington, UK
 2013: How To Disappear Completely, Andrew Edlin Gallery, New York, NY
 2014: Liner Notes'', R Jampol Projects, New York, NY

Bibliography

References

Further reading 
 April 25, 2016, "Escape Your Home in a Game About the Anxieties of OCD" Hyperallergic
 December 9, 2015, "The Best in Art of 2015’." New York Times
 August 6, 2015, "What to Do This Weekend’." New York Times
 July 14, 2015, "Two Chelsea Galleries Go Wall Out for Summer" Hyperallergic
 July 9, 2015, "Review:'Anthems for the Mother Earth Goddess’." New York Times
 December 19, 2014, "Crossing Brooklyn, Without Leaving the Safe Parts" Hyperallergic
 October 25, 2013, "Visions of the World in Pieces" Hyperallergic
 September 26, 2013, "Brian Adam Douglas: ‘How to Disappear Completely’." New York Times

External links 

 http://www.endgamesinteractive.com/ - archived version

1972 births
Living people
Artists from New York City
People from Plano, Texas
School of Visual Arts alumni